St Lappan's Church is a small Gothic Revival Anglican church located in Little Island, County Cork, Ireland. It was completed in 1866. It is dedicated to Saint Lappan. It is part of the Diocese of Cork, Cloyne, and Ross.

History 
Built between 1864 and 1866, St Lappan's Church was funded in part by a bequest from a Miss Hester Bury.

Architecture 
The building was designed by Welland & Gillespie under the superintendence of Henry Hill. The church is made of limestone, and features a prominent spire. The church is built in the Gothic Revival style. The church features several notable stained-glass lancet windows.

References

Notes

Sources 

Architecture in Ireland
Churches in the Diocese of Cork, Cloyne and Ross
19th-century Church of Ireland church buildings
Gothic Revival church buildings in the Republic of Ireland
19th-century churches in the Republic of Ireland